The 2017 ICC Women's Cricket World Cup Qualifier was an international women's cricket tournament that was held in Colombo, Sri Lanka, from 7 to 21 February 2017. It was the final stage of the qualification process for the 2017 World Cup in England. The tournament was the fourth edition of the World Cup Qualifier, and the first to be held in Sri Lanka.

The final was contested between India and South Africa, with India winning by 1 wicket. Along with the two finalists, both Sri Lanka and Pakistan have qualified for the 2017 Women's Cricket World Cup. As well as the four qualifiers for the Cricket World Cup, Bangladesh and Ireland kept their ODI status until 2021 by virtue of them reaching the Super Six stage of the tournament.

Participating teams

Ten teams participated – Bangladesh and Ireland qualified automatically by virtue of having One Day International (ODI) status, while the other eight teams included the bottom four teams of the 2014–16 ICC Women's Championship and the four winners of the regional qualifiers. The top four teams at the World Cup Qualifier qualified for the World Cup.

  (Bottom 4 of ICC Women's Championship)
  (Bottom 4 of ICC Women's Championship)
  (Bottom 4 of ICC Women's Championship)
  (Bottom 4 of ICC Women's Championship)
  (automatic qualification – ODI status)
  (automatic qualification – ODI status)
  (Africa regional qualifier)
  (Asia regional qualifier)
  (East Asia-Pacific regional qualifier)
  (Europe regional qualifier)

Squads
The International Cricket Council (ICC) confirmed all the squads for the tournament on 24 January 2017.

Mona Meshram replaced Smriti Mandhana in India's squad after Mandhana was injured during a match in the 2016–17 Women's Big Bash League. Later, both Jhulan Goswami and Sukanya Parida were also ruled out of India's squad due to injury. They were replaced by Soni Yadav and Mansi Joshi respectively. Ahead of the tournament, Sidra Nawaz was ruled out of Pakistan's squad due to injury and was replaced by Rabiya Shah. Anam Amin and Sidra Ameen were also withdrawn from Pakistan's squad, being replaced by Sadia Yousuf and Muneeba Ali respectively. Bangladesh replaced Fahima Khatun and Lata Mondol with Shaila Sharmin and Murshida Khatun.

Format
The ten teams at the tournament were initially divided into two groups of five. The top three teams from each group progressed to the Super Six stage, and also earned ODI status until the next World Cup. The top four teams from the Super Six stage qualified for the World Cup, although there was still be a final to determine the overall winner of the World Cup Qualifier. In December 2016 the International Cricket Council (ICC) announced the fixtures and format for the tournament.

First round

Group A

Group B

Super Six stage

Final

See also
 2012 ICC Women's World Twenty20, the most recent ICC women's tournament to be held in Sri Lanka

References

External links
 Series home at ESPN Cricinfo

2017
2017 in Sri Lankan cricket
2017 in women's cricket
International cricket competitions in 2016–17
International women's cricket competitions in Sri Lanka
February 2017 sports events in Asia
Qualifier